Luis López was a seventeenth-century Spanish editor.

López was born in Palencia, but moved to Zaragoza to work as a pastry chef. He later devoted himself to editing. He published several books under his own name, which led some to suppose that he was the author, but it seems more likely that they were written by various Aragonese scholars.

Works
 (Universal Chronological Tables of Spain, From the Year 1800 of the Creation of the World, When the Patriarch Tubal Began to Populate Spain, for 3799 Years Until our Times) (Zaragoza, 1637)
 ("Thropheos" and the Antiquities of the Imperial City of Zaragoza, and its General History from its Foundation by the Grandchildren of the Patriarch Noah after the Universal Flood, to our Times) (Barcelona, 1639)
 (The Pillar of Zaragoza, the Most Firm Column of the Faith in Spain, the World's First Catholic Church, Built in the Name of the Most Holy Mary by the Apostle James, son of Zebedee) (Alcalá, 1649)
 (Annals of the Kingdom of Aragón)

References 

Spanish editors
People from Palencia
 17th-century Spanish people